The 1906–07 season was the 8th season for FC Barcelona.

Squad

Results

External links

References

FC Barcelona seasons
Barcelona